Devika Bhagat (born 25 October 1979) is an Indian screenwriter in the Hindi film industry, who has written films like Manorama Six Feet Under (2007, Bachna Ae Haseeno (2008) and Ladies vs Ricky Bahl (2011)

Early life and education 
She was born in New Delhi, India.

She is an alumna of Convent of Jesus and Mary school in Delhi and United World College of the Atlantic in Wales UK. She has a BFA degree in Film and Television Production from Tisch School of the Arts, New York University class of 2002.

Career
In the film industry, her first job was that of a post-production intern for Monsoon Wedding (2001)

Filmography

Television

References

External links

1979 births
Living people
Indian women screenwriters
Women writers from Delhi
Tisch School of the Arts alumni
People educated at Atlantic College
Hindi screenwriters
Screenwriters from Delhi
21st-century Indian dramatists and playwrights
21st-century Indian women writers
21st-century Indian writers